Dorchester School District Two is a school district based in Summerville, South Carolina, United States.

It serves the southeastern portion of Dorchester County, including sections of Summerville and North Charleston.

Schools

High schools
 Ashley Ridge High School
 Fort Dorchester High School
 Summerville High School

Middle schools
 Alston Middle School
 DuBose Middle School
 East Edisto Middle School
 Gregg Middle School
 Oakbrook Middle School
 Rollings Middle School of the Arts
 River Oaks Middle School

Elementary schools
 Alston-Bailey Elementary School
 Beech Hill Elementary School
 Eagle Nest Elementary School
 Flowertown Elementary School
 Fort Dorchester Elementary School
 Knightsville Elementary School  
 Newington Elementary School
 Oakbrook Elementary School
 Pye Elementary School
 Sandhill Elementary School 
 Sires Elementary School 
 Spann Elementary School
 Summerville Elementary School
 William Reeves Elementary School
 Windsor Hill Elementary School

Givhans Alternative Program

Givhans Alternative Program (GAP) was established to provide varying levels of instruction for students who struggle in the mainstream programs of Dorchester District Two. Typically, students at GAP receive a high level of instruction due to the rigorous structure and smaller class sizes provided by the school.

References

External links
Dorchester School District Two official site

School districts in South Carolina
Education in Dorchester County, South Carolina
North Charleston, South Carolina